Trafalgar railway station is located on the Gippsland line in Victoria, Australia. It serves the town of Trafalgar, and it opened on 1 August 1878. On 5 May 1884, it was renamed Narracan, and was renamed Trafalgar on 2 June of that year.

In 1955, electrification of the line was extended from Warragul to Moe, passing through the station. In 1958, the line from Yarragon was duplicated, and included a new Down platform (Platform 2), a new signal panel and flashing light signals at the Ashby Street level crossing, located nearby in the Up direction of the station. In 1960, the line between Trafalgar and Moe was duplicated.

On 2 July 1987, electrification between Warragul and Traralgon ceased. In 1996, a footbridge at the station, which was located at the Up end, was closed, and replaced with a pedestrian crossing. In 1997, boom barriers were provided at the Ashby Street level crossing.

A disused goods shed and platform formerly existed behind Platform 2. However, were removed in 2004 by the current land owners, Reid Stockfeeds. On 28 April 2006, the signal panel was abolished.

Platforms and services

Trafalgar has two side platforms. Most trains depart from Platform 1, but some peak hour services use Platform 2. It is serviced by V/Line Traralgon and selected Bairnsdale line services.

Platform 1:
 services to Traralgon, Bairnsdale and Southern Cross

Platform 2:
 services to Traralgon, Bairnsdale and Southern Cross

Transport links

Warragul Bus Lines operates two routes via Trafalgar station, under contract to Public Transport Victoria:
Garfield station – Traralgon Plaza
Traralgon station – Drouin North

References

External links
Victorian Railway Stations Gallery
Melway map

Railway stations in Australia opened in 1878
Regional railway stations in Victoria (Australia)
Transport in Gippsland (region)
Shire of Baw Baw